This is a list of people who disappeared mysteriously post-1990 and of people whose current whereabouts are unknown or whose deaths are not substantiated, except for people who disappeared at sea.
Since the 1970s, many individuals around the world have disappeared, whose whereabouts and condition have remained unknown. Many who disappear are eventually declared dead in absentia, but the circumstances and dates of their deaths remain a mystery. Some of these people were possibly subjected to forced disappearance, but in some cases information on their subsequent fates is insufficient.

The global statistical data on missing persons throughout the world from the late 20th and early 21st centuries are unreliable due to a number of factors, including international migration, travel capabilities, and legal protection for individuals who may have chosen to disappear intentionally. According to the International Commission on Missing Persons, "There are few comprehensive and reliable statistics regarding the number of persons who go missing throughout the world as a result of trafficking, drug-related violence, and migration. Even the numbers of persons missing as a result of armed conflict and human-rights abuses, which are more intensively monitored, are difficult to verify, given the reluctance of most states to deal honestly and effectively with this issue".

By the mid-1990s in the United States of America, the number of missing persons cases had grown to nearly 1 million, though this number began to decline in the 2000s. As of 2014, an estimated average of 90,000 in the United States are missing at any given time, with about 60% being adults, and 40% being children; in 2017, the total number of missing person cases was around 650,000. Per a 2017 report, the U.S. states of Oregon, Arizona, and Alaska have the highest numbers of missing-person cases per 100,000 people. In Canada—with a population a little more than one tenth that of the United States—the number of missing-person cases is smaller, but the rate per capita is higher, with an estimated 71,000 reported in 2015. Of these missing Canadians, 88% are found within seven days, while roughly 500 individuals remain missing after a year. In the United Kingdom, it was estimated in 2009 that around 275,000 Britons go missing every year. In some countries, such as Japan, the prevalence of missing persons is not commensurate with the known data, as significant numbers of missing individuals go unreported to authorities.

1990s

2000s

2010s

2020s

See also

 List of fugitives from justice who disappeared
 List of kidnappings
 List of murder convictions without a body
 List of people who disappeared mysteriously: pre-1910
 List of people who disappeared mysteriously: 1910–1990
 Lists of solved missing person cases
 Enforced disappearance#China
 List of unsolved deaths

References

20th-century missing person cases
21st-century missing person cases
Disappeared
People